Libyan Arab Airlines Flight 1103 was a Boeing 727-2L5 with 10 crew and 147 passengers on board that collided with a LARAF Mikoyan-Gurevich MiG-23 on 22 December 1992. All 157 people on board flight 1103 were killed, while the crew of the MiG-23 ejected and survived. It was the deadliest aviation disaster to occur in Libya at the time.

Crash
On 22 December 1992 Flight 1103 took off from Benina International Airport near Benghazi on a domestic flight to Tripoli International Airport under the command of Captain Ali Al-Faqih, First Officer Mahmoud Issa, Trainee First Officer Abed Al-Jalil Al-Zarrouq, and Flight Engineer Salem Abu Sitta. At an altitude of  during the Boeing 727's approach to Tripoli airport, the aircraft tail collided with a Mikoyan-Gurevich MiG-23 right wing and disintegrated, resulting in the death of all 157 passengers and crew. The two crew members of the MiG-23 ejected before impact and survived.

Investigation and aftermath
The official explanation and air accident investigation report both blamed a collision with a Libyan Air Force MiG-23; the pilot and instructor of the MiG were imprisoned.

After the crash, a spokesman for the Libyan Civil Authority stated he had been forbidden from releasing any information about the crash, including which planes had been involved. A mass grave was prepared for the victims outside of Tripoli with poor international relations denying the bodies of international victims being returned to their families.

Twenty years later, after the fall of Muammar Gaddafi, Major Abdel Majid Al-Tayari, the instructor in the MiG-23 aircraft, challenged the official version of events, claiming that Flight 1103 was deliberately destroyed, because he saw its tail falling before his aircraft suffered a strong impact (from either the shock wave of the explosion that destroyed the Boeing 727 or a piece of wreckage) and he was forced to eject from his aircraft along with his trainee, Lieutenant Colonel Ahmed Abu Sneina. In a statement Al-Tayari claims there was no air collision, but conceded that the planes were too close to one another.

Ali Aujali, who served as a Libyan diplomat both under Gaddafi and under the National Transitional Council, claims that Gaddafi ordered that the Boeing 727, whose flight was assigned the number 1103, be shot down exactly four years to the day after the bombing of Pan Am Flight 103 in order to demonstrate the negative effects of international sanctions imposed on Libya. According to Aujali, the dictator originally ordered a bomb with a timer to be in the aircraft, but when this failed to explode, he "ordered the [aircraft] to be knocked out of the sky". The widow of one British victim has claimed Libyan families of victims had asked if she had tested her husband's passports for explosive residue.

Memorials 
The first memorial for the crash was held near Tripoli, Libya in 2012. The ceremony was attended by families and friends of the victims, and politicians.

See also 

 Flight 706: F-4 Phantom/DC-9 mid-air collision disaster
 Gol Transportes Aéreos Flight 1907
 1983 Negev mid-air collision
 Iran Air Flight 655
 1993 Tehran mid-air collision
 1997 Israeli helicopter disaster

Notes

References
 "Boeing 727 Crashes in Libya". Flight International, 6–12 January 1993. p. 8.

External links 

Aviation accidents and incidents in 1992
1992 in Libya
Aviation accidents and incidents in Libya
Accidents and incidents involving the Boeing 727
1103
Mid-air collisions
Mid-air collisions involving airliners
Mid-air collisions involving military aircraft
December 1992 events in Africa
Aviation accident investigations with disputed causes